Augustyn Wróblewski (1866–1913) was a Polish biochemist and anarchist.

1866 births
1913 deaths
Polish cooperative organizers
Polish Socialist Party politicians
Polish anarchists
19th-century Polish philosophers
20th-century Polish philosophers
Polish chemists
Anarcho-syndicalists
Augustyn